Littoraria mauritiana is a species of sea snail, a marine gastropod mollusk in the family Littorinidae, the winkles or periwinkles.

Description
The length of the shell attains 7 mm.

Distribution
This species occurs off Réunion and Mauritius.

References

 Reid, D.G. (1986). The littorinid molluscs of mangrove forests in the Indo-Pacific region. British Museum (Natural History), London
 Reid, D.G., Dyal, P., & Williams, S.T. (2010). Global diversification of mangrove fauna: a molecular phylogeny of Littoraria (Gastropoda: Littorinidae). Molecular Phylogenetics and Evolution. 55:185-201

External links
 Lamarck, [J.-B. M. de. (1822). Histoire naturelle des animaux sans vertèbres. Tome septième. Paris: published by the Author, 711 pp]
 Deshayes, G. P., 1863 Catalogue des mollusques de l'ile de la Réunion (Bourbon). Annexe E, in: Maillard, L. Notes sur l'isle de La Réunion, p. 1-4, 1-144
 Reid D.G. (1989) The comparative morphology, phylogeny and evolution of the gastropod family Littorinidae. Philosophical Transactions of the Royal Society B 324: 1-110

Littorinidae
Gastropods described in 1822